Typhoon Agnes, known in the Philippines as Typhoon Pining, produced among the heaviest rains recorded during the 20th century in South Korea, with  falling over a two-day span. The storm originated as a tropical depression near Guam on August 25, 1981. Moving along a west-northwest to northwest track, the system gradually strengthened as deep convection organized around it. The depression was assigned the name Agnes on August 27 following the development of gale-force winds. Further intensification to typhoon-status occurred by August 29. Subsequent interaction with a mid-latitude trough induced an extratropical transition as the cyclone slowed and turned north. The system had lost most of its tropical characteristics by September 1, with the majority of convection sheared northeast over South Korea and Japan. Agnes later accelerated northeast and completed its transition on September 3. The remnants continued along this course, impacting northern Japan and the Kamchatka Peninsula before last being noted on September 6 near the International Date Line.

Throughout the course of Agnes' existence, several countries were affected by torrential rains and typhoon-force winds. Hardest hit was South Korea where record-breaking rains triggered widespread flooding. A total of 113 people died in the country while damage reached $134 million. Taiwan saw similarly destructive rains which left 32 people dead or missing. A further 14 people died in mainland China where coastal flooding from the typhoon's slow movement coincided with the spring tide, resulting in the greatest storm surge since 1949 along the Yangtze estuary and Hangzhou Bay. Much of Japan saw rains from the storm, though no significant damage or loss of life took place in the country.

Meteorological history

On August 23, 1981, following several days of tranquil weather, a tropical upper tropospheric trough (TUTT) began building westward from the International Date Line, near Wake Island. Over the following 36 hours, an expansive area of convection developed southwest of the organizing TUTT. On August 25, surface observations on Guam in the Mariana Islands indicated the presence of a low-pressure system. Coinciding with this, the Japan Meteorological Agency (JMA) declared the formation of a tropical depression at 06:00 UTC. Weather reconnaissance missions throughout the day indicated a 1006 mbar (hPa) center west of Guam, prompting the Joint Typhoon Warning Center (JTWC) to issue a Tropical Cyclone Formation Alert.

Tracking west-northwest and later northwest around the southwestern edge of a subtropical ridge, steady intensification of the cyclone ensued. In light of this, the JTWC assigned the name Agnes to the storm. Additionally due to its proximity to the Philippines, the Philippine Atmospheric, Geophysical and Astronomical Services Administration dubbed the system with the local name Pining. Strengthening occurred at a climatological rate, with Agnes attaining typhoon-status on August 29. A large, banding eye-feature developed within the core of Agnes as it approached the Ryukyu Islands of southwestern Japan. This ranked it as a Category 2-equivalent on the Saffir–Simpson hurricane wind scale.

As the storm moved over the East China Sea on September 1, Agnes began to interact with a mid-latitude trough situated south of South Korea and began a prolonged extratropical transition. Increasing wind shear exposed the center of the typhoon and displaced convection to the north and east. Subsequent slowing of the cyclone's forward speed as it turned northward resulted in an extended period of heavy rain for much of South Korea. The JTWC estimated Agnes to have become predominantly extratropical by the end of September 1, coinciding with the system weakening below typhoon intensity. The JMA, however, maintained the storm as a tropical system as it began moving northwest. The diminishing cyclone moved over the Korea Strait on September 3 and completed its extratropical transition that afternoon. Accelerating over the Sea of Japan, the remnant storm deepened slightly before striking the northern Japanese island of Hokkaido on September 4 with an estimated pressure of 976 mbar (hPa). After moving over the Sea of Okhotsk, Agnes impacted the Kamchatka Peninsula of Russia on September 5. The system then moved over the open waters of the North Pacific and was last noted near the International Date Line on September 6.

Impact

Japan

On August 30, Typhoon Agnes moved through the southern Ryukyu Islands, bringing strong winds and heavy rain to the region.

After moving over the Sea of Japan, the storm's remnants brought heavy rains to much of Japan the day after a 6.6 Mw earthquake rocked eastern parts of the country. Air and sea transportation across the Korean Strait was cancelled for September 3. Landslides were reported across Kyushu, though no casualties occurred.

China and Taiwan
Though Agnes did not directly impact Taiwan, prolonged southwesterly flow associated with the typhoon brought torrential rains to the island. Flooding in southern Taiwan was considered the worst in 30 years; 32 people were killed or left missing. An estimated 3,000 people were left homeless.

Significant water rise occurred along Yangtze estuary and Hangzhou Bay in mainland China as Agnes remained just east of the area for 36 hours and the coincidence of the spring tide. Model simulations of the event estimated that a  surge affected the Waigaoqiao Free Trade Zone in Shanghai. Offshore, 300 vessels sank while the resulting inland floods killed 14 people. Authorities in Shanghai mobilized 100,000 personnel to limit the extent of the floods as 200 sections of seawall collapsed. According to local newspapers,  of farmland flooded and 4,280 homes were damaged. Losses were estimated in the millions of dollars.

High winds downed many trees across the region and debris littered the streets of Shanghai. United States President Jimmy Carter, wrapping up an inspection of the Chinese Navy, was scheduled to take a cruise out of the Huangpu River; however, the typhoon forced the vessel to remain at port.

South Korea
Between September 1 and 3, torrential rains affected much of South Korea, with the heaviest falling well-ahead of the storm itself. Regarded as the heaviest on record in the 20th century, at least  fell over a two-day span in the country, resulting in tremendous flash flooding and landslides. This surpassed the previous two-day record of  measured in 1928 in Seoul.

Communications with severed with towns along the southwestern coastline as roads and rail lines were washed away. Thousands of residents sought refuge by moving to higher ground. The Korean relief center reported that 762 homes were destroyed and another 11,700 flooded due to the storm. Other reports indicated that upwards of 5,900 homes were destroyed. Throughout South Korea, 113 people died. Most of the deaths resulted from landslides, swollen rivers, and collapsed embankments. Total damage in the country amounted to $134 million, with agriculture accounting for at least $24 million. Additionally, 28,000 people were left homeless. The disaster relief agency Hope Bridge provided 7.5 billion won ($10.2 million) in aid to areas affected by the storm.

See also

1981 Pacific typhoon season
Typhoon Maemi – The strongest recorded typhoon to strike South Korea
List of wettest tropical cyclones by country
Typhoon Rusa – Surpassed Agnes as the wettest tropical cyclone in South Korea in 2002
Tropical Storm Nakri (2014) – The wettest-known tropical cyclone in South Korea as of 2014

Notes

References

Agnes
Typhoon Agnes
Agnes 1981
Agnes 1981
Agnes 1981
Agnes 1981
Agnes 1981
Agnes